Rudhra are a Brahmin community found in the state of Gujarat and Uttar Pradesh in India. Rudhra caste people are said to be the descendants of Lord Shiva. Rudra is also a form of Lord Shiva due to which this caste was named Rudhra.

References

Brahmin communities of Gujarat
Brahmin communities
Brahmin communities of Uttar Pradesh